The following is a list of notable trees. Trees listed here are regarded as important or specific by their historical, national, locational, natural or mythological context. The list includes actual trees located throughout the world, as well as trees from myths and religions.

Real forests and individual trees

Africa

Living

Historical

Asia

Living

Historical

Europe

Living

Historical

Petrified

North America

Living

Historical

Petrified

Other
Anthem Christmas tree, the tallest Christmas tree in the United States, erected annually at the Outlets at Anthem outside Phoenix, Arizona.
Boston Christmas Tree. Since 1971, given to Boston by the people of Nova Scotia in thanks for their assistance during the 1917 Halifax Explosion. Located in the Boston Common.
Capitol Christmas Tree, the tree erected annually on the West Front Lawn of the United States Capitol, in Washington, D.C. 
Chicago Christmas Tree, the annual tree located in Millennium Park in the city of Chicago. Historically, the tree was located in Grant Park and Daley Plaza.
Grove Christmas Tree, a 100-foot tree that is lit every year at The Grove at Farmer's Market in Los Angeles, California.
Rockefeller Center Christmas Tree, a Christmas tree on display every December in Rockefeller Center, New York City.
The Tree of Life, a fourteen-story artificial tree in Disney's Animal Kingdom at Walt Disney World in Florida.

Central America

Living

Guanacaste tree, focal point of Guanacaste National Park, Belize.

South America

Living

Historical

Petrified

Oceania

Living

Historical
El Grande, a mountain ash once regarded as Australia's largest tree by volume, killed by a forestry burnoff in 2003.
The Tree of Knowledge at Barcaldine, Queensland  under which the Australian Labor Party was traditionally founded. In an act of vandalism, the tree was poisoned and was eventually declared dead in October 2006.
The pine of One Tree Hill, a radiata pine which stood alone until 2000 atop One Tree Hill (Maungakiekie), an extinct volcanic cone in Auckland, New Zealand.
The Old Gum Tree, Glenelg, South Australia, where the proclamation of the establishment of Government of the province of South Australia was read in 1836.
The Explorers Tree, marked by the explorers who crossed the Blue Mountains (New South Wales) in 1813.
Jacaranda, University of Sydney, famous tree in the main Quadrangle. Planted 1928. Died of old age in 2016, it was replaced by a clone the following year.
Separation Tree, a famous tree that was a Melbourne landmark and is best known as the site where the citizens of the city congregated on 15 November 1850 to celebrate when the news that Victoria was to separate from the colony of New South Wales. Following attacks by vandals it died in 2015.
Kidman's Tree of Knowledge is a heritage-listed tree at Glengyle Station in Bedourie, Queensland, Australia. Associated with Sidney Kidman who once camped under the tree and planned the expansion of his pastoral empire.
The Directions Tree was a sacred tree in the Birthing Woods, carrying profound cultural importance to the Djab Wurrung people, in Victoria, Australia was bulldozed in 2020 to make way for a highway despite the efforts of many trying to protect it. This event caused significant uproar and was part of a larger legal battle for the protection of the Birthing Woods as being a culturally significant location having been overturned since the 2013 decision.

Mythological and religious trees

Bodhi Tree, under which Siddhartha Gautama, the spiritual teacher and founder of Buddhism later known as Gautama Buddha, achieved enlightenment (also called Bodhi).
World Tree
Égig érő fa, the "Tree Reaching into the Sky" of Hungarian folk art and a folk tale type
Irminsul
Jievaras, the World tree in Lithuanian mythology.
Yggdrasil, the World Tree in the Old Norse religion.
Cutting of the elm, a legendary event concerning a tree at Gisors.
Cypress of Kashmar, planted by Zoroaster and felled by Caliph Al Mutawakkil.
 Man-eating tree
Thor's Oak, a sacred tree to the ancient Germanic tribe of the Chatti.
Tree of Knowledge of Good and Evil, from Christianity and Judaism.
Tree of Life, from Christianity and Judaism.
The Lote Tree
The Zaqqum Tree

See also

European Tree of the Year
Tree of the Year (United Kingdom)
List of superlative trees
List of oldest trees
List of long-living organisms
List of elm trees
List of largest giant sequoias
List of named Eucalyptus trees
List of banyan trees in India
List of individual trees in Estonia
List of Great British Trees
Gerichtslinde
List of hanging trees
List of tallest trees
List of tree genera
Veteran tree
Bonsai
 Capitol Christmas Tree
 National Christmas Tree (United States)
 Rockefeller Center Christmas Tree
 Vatican Christmas Tree

References

External links
Map of this list (in progress)
World’s first tree reconstructed 385 million-year-old tree

 

de:Liste markanter und alter Baumexemplare
fr:Liste des arbres remarquables
lt:Sąrašas:Išskirtiniai medžiai
hu:Híres fák listája
ru:Список знаменитых и легендарных деревьев